Mill Hill railway station serves Mill Hill in the Blackburn with Darwen borough in Lancashire, England. It is an island platformed station managed by Northern. It was opened by the Lancashire and Yorkshire Railway in 1884, almost forty years after the line itself.

It is unstaffed, with no permanent buildings other than basic shelters on the platform.  Digital information screens and a P.A system are installed to give intending passengers train running information.

As of January 2018, along with other stations on this line, a new touch screen ticket machine was added to the Station.

It has no step-free disabled access, with an entrance down a single flight of stairs from street level. From the street level above there are also direct bus services to Blackburn town centre.

Services

Monday to Saturdays, there is an hourly service from Mill Hill towards Preston westbound and an hourly service to Blackburn, Burnley Central and  eastbound. A single morning peak service from York to Preston also calls, along with a corresponding evening peak train to Leeds.

There is a two-hourly service in each direction on Sundays.

References

External links

Railway stations in Blackburn with Darwen
DfT Category F2 stations
Buildings and structures in Blackburn
Former Lancashire and Yorkshire Railway stations
Northern franchise railway stations
Railway stations in Great Britain opened in 1884